Intermedia Films was an American independent film production company, wholly owned by IM Internationalmedia AG.   

The company mostly acted as a co-producer, funding films through the IMF (Internationale Medien und Film, German for "International Media and Film") funds. As of 2012, Intermedia's library was owned by Ron Tutor and David Bergstein.

History 

The company was founded in London in 1991 as Intermedia Film Equities. Four years later, it was re-established as Intermedia Films by Guy East (formerly of Goldcrest Films and Majestic Films International) and Nigel Sinclair. By 1997, Intermedia began operations in Los Angeles, as did Pacifica Film Distribution. The two companies merged on March 29, 2000.

Its first success of note was Sliding Doors, starring Gwyneth Paltrow, which opened the Sundance Film Festival.

Filmography

References

External links 
 IM Internationalmedia AG English website

Defunct film and television production companies of the United Kingdom
Defunct film and television production companies of the United States
Companies based in Los Angeles
Mass media companies established in 1991
American independent film studios
1991 establishments in England
Mass media companies disestablished in 2006
2006 disestablishments in California